Esha Rohit Oza (born 1 August 1998) is an Indian-born cricketer who plays for the United Arab Emirates national cricket team. In July 2018, she was named in the United Arab Emirates' squad for the 2018 ICC Women's World Twenty20 Qualifier tournament. She made her Women's Twenty20 International (WT20I) for the United Arab Emirates against the Netherlands in the World Twenty20 Qualifier on 7 July 2018. In July 2018, she was named in the ICC Women's Global Development Squad.
Oza holds the record of the highest score by a UAE international in limited overs cricket and is also the fastest player to reach 1000 T20I runs in WT20Is. She reached the record when she scored 115 vs Qatar at the ACC Womens Championship 2022.
In January 2023, Esha Oza was named as the ICC Women's Associate Player of the Year for 2022.

Early and personal life
Oza was born in Mumbai in the state of Maharashtra, India and came to the Dubai, United Arab Emirates with her family when she was only eight months old. She is pursuing Business Management at the University of Wollongong at Dubai.

Domestic career
Oza played domestic cricket at the Desert Cubs Cricket Academy and captained the winning team at the UAE National Women's Tournament in 2017. In her breakthrough season in 2018 ECB Women's National T20 League, she  made the Most Valuable Player (MVP) list with highest run-scorer as well as the joint highest wicket-taker along with hitting her maiden century. In 2018, She was the only Emirati player to be selected for the ICC Women's Global Development Squad, which toured England to play against the KIA Super League clubs.

Oza joined the Mumbai women's cricket team in 2019 and is representing the team in the domestic under-23 and senior women's tournaments in India.

International career
Oza was selected in the United Arab Emirates' squad for the 2018 ICC Women's World Twenty20 Qualifier tournament and played her senior debut Women's Twenty20 International (WT20I) match for the United Arab Emirates against the Netherlands  on 7 July 2018.
In May 2022 Oza was named in the Warriors Squad at the FairBreak International 2022

In October 2022, she played for UAE in Women's Twenty20 Asia Cup.

References

Further reading

External links
 
 

1998 births
Living people
Cricketers from Mumbai
People from Dubai
Emirati women cricketers
United Arab Emirates women Twenty20 International cricketers
Indian emigrants to the United Arab Emirates
Indian expatriate sportspeople in the United Arab Emirates
Indian women cricketers
Sportswomen from Maharashtra
Mumbai women cricketers